Maurice Antoine Turner is a former running back in the National Football League. He was drafted in the twelfth round of the 1983 NFL Draft by the Minnesota Vikings and would play with the team during the 1984 NFL season before splitting the following season between the Vikings and the Green Bay Packers. After a year away from the NFL, he was a member of the New York Jets during the 1987 NFL season.

His son, Billy Turner, was an All-American offensive lineman at North Dakota State, and is currently playing for the Denver Broncos.  Another son, Bryan Kehl, also played in the NFL.

References

Minnesota Vikings players
Green Bay Packers players
New York Jets players
American football running backs
Players of American football from Salt Lake City
Utah State Aggies football players
1960 births
Living people
National Football League replacement players